The ULBI Wild Thing is a German ultralight aircraft, designed by R. Kurtz and produced by Ultraleicht Bau International (ULBI), of Hassfurt. The aircraft was supplied as a kit for amateur construction or as a complete ready-to-fly-aircraft.

In the 1990s the aircraft was marketed by Air-Max GmbH of Nuremberg, Germany.

The aircraft was introduced in 1996 and production ended when ULBI went out of business in 2014.

Design and development
The aircraft was designed specifically for touring in Africa. It was intended to comply with the Fédération Aéronautique Internationale microlight rules. It features a strut-braced high wing, a two-seats-in-side-by-side configuration enclosed cockpit with doors for access, fixed tricycle landing gear or conventional landing gear and a single engine in tractor configuration.

The aircraft is made from sheet aluminum. Standard engines available are the  Rotax 912ULS,  Jabiru 2200 and the  Jabiru 3300 four-stroke powerplants. The  Hirth F-30,  Limbach L2000 and the   Lycoming O-360 have also been fitted.

Variants
WT 01
Conventional landing gear-equipped model
WT 02
Tricycle landing gear-equipped model

Specifications (WT 02)

See also
Similar aircraft
Murphy Rebel

References

External links

1990s German ultralight aircraft
Homebuilt aircraft
Single-engined tractor aircraft